Kaare Engebretsen (22 August 1893  – 16 October 1960) was a Norwegian footballer. He played in eleven matches for the Norway national football team between 1913 and 1917.

References

External links
 

1893 births
1960 deaths
Norwegian footballers
Norway international footballers
Footballers from Oslo
Association football forwards
Lyn Fotball players